France Darget Savarit (26 December 1886 – 26 August 1965) was a French writer. Her work was part of the literature event in the art competition at the 1924 Summer Olympics.

References

1886 births
1965 deaths
19th-century French women writers
20th-century French women writers
Olympic competitors in art competitions
People from Pontivy